Ken Anderson (born Rembrandt, Iowa, US December 23, 1917, died Warsaw, Indiana, US March 12, 2006) Was an American screenwriter, director and producer of Christian films. Best remembered for Pilgrim's Progress, an adaptation of The Pilgrim's Progress by John Bunyan, which marked the first screen appearance for actor Liam Neeson. Anderson authored 77 fiction and non-fiction books over 6 decades including the best-seller Where to Find It in the Bible. He was the first editor for the Youth for Christ magazine which came to be known as "Campus Life."

In 1949, Anderson founded Gospel Films, which grew into the world's largest distributor of Christian films. In 1961, he and wife Doris (Jones) left to form Ken Anderson Films, a for-profit company eventually releasing over 200 live-action and animated titles, including original dramas for many overseas countries.
As a pioneer in the field, Anderson directly and indirectly influenced and encouraged many non-profit Christian film company start-ups.

Filmography

Director
1961: The Family that Changed the World
1964: In His Steps
1965: Man of Steel
1969: Journey to the Sky
1972: The Gospel According to Most People
1979: Pilgrim's Progress
1979: Christiana
1981: Hudson Taylor
1982: The Answer
1984: Fanny Crosby
1984: Mud, Sweat and Cheers
1986: Mark of the Red Hand
1986: Second Step

Producer
1972: The Gospel According to Most People
1981: Hudson Taylor
1984: Fanny Crosby

Writer
1964: In His Steps
1974: Apache Fire
1979: Pilgrim's Progress
1979: Christiana
1981: Hudson Taylor

References

External links

American film directors
American film producers
American male screenwriters
1917 births
2006 deaths
20th-century American male writers
20th-century American screenwriters